Memorial Day is an American holiday.

Memorial Day may also refer to:

Commemorative days
 Armenian Memorial Day or Armenian Genocide Remembrance Day
 Memorial Day (Azerbaijan)
 In China:
Qingming Festival
Nanjing Massacre Memorial Day
Martyrs' Day (China)
 Memorial Day (Israel) or Yom Hazikaron
 Memorial Day (Newfoundland and Labrador)
 Memorial Day (South Korea)
 Memorial Day (Ukraine)
 Memorial Day (Turkmenistan)
 Confederate Memorial Day, an observance in the Southern U.S. that began in 1866

Film
 Memorial Day (1983 film)
 Memorial Day (1998 film), a film starring Stephanie Niznik
 Memorial Day (1999 film)
 Memorial Day (2012 film)

Other uses
 Memorial Day (novel), a 2004 novel by Vince Flynn
 Memorial Day (album), an album by Full Blooded
 "Memorial Day" (The West Wing), an episode of The West Wing
 Memorial Day Handicap, an American Thoroughbred horse race
 "Memorial Day", a 1979 song by Carly Simon from Spy